Scott Keegan Andrews (born 5 November 1971) is an English author of science fiction. His School's Out trilogy was published by Abaddon, and his Timebomb trilogy was published by Hodder and Stoughton. His first novel was filmed as School's Out Forever.

He is the son of the singer and songwriter Harvey Andrews.

Bibliography

The School's Out Trilogy
School's Out (2007)
Operation Motherland (2009)
Children's Crusade (2010)
School's Out Forever - Omnibus of trilogy (2012)

The Timebomb trilogy
Timebomb (October 2014)
Timebomb: Second Lives (May 2016)
Timebomb: The New World (July 2017)

Short fiction
The Anchorite's Echo in Doctor Who Short Trips: The History of Christmas, (2005; edited by Simon Guerrier)
The Man Who Would Not Be King (2009) (Afterblight Chronicles)
A Private Viewing in Pandemonium: Tales of the Apocalypse, (2011; edited by Anne C. Perry & Jared Shurin)
Sniper Elite V2 - Target Hitler (2012; novella, Rebellion)
Grit in A Town Called Pandemonium, (2012; edited by Anne C. Perry & Jared Shurin)
Sniper Elite - Water Line (2022; novella, Rebellion)

Non-fiction
Troubled Waters: An Unauthorised and Unofficial Guide to "Dawson's Creek" (2001)
Uncharted Territory: The Unofficial And Unauthorised Guide to Farscape (2002)

Computer Games
Sniper Elite V2 (2012)
Sniper Elite 5 (2022)

Discography

Stargate audio drama
Stargate Atlantis: Impressions (2009)

Highlander audio drama
Highlander: The Four Horsemen 1: Brothers (2011)
Highlander: The Four Horsemen 2: All The King's Horses (2011)
Highlander: The Four Horsemen 3: The Pain Eater (2011)

References

External links
Author's Website
Author's Twitter
Author's Facebook

1971 births
English children's writers
Living people
English science fiction writers